Sher-E-Hindustan is a 2019 Indian Bhojpuri language action drama film written and directed by Manoj Narayan and produced by Ratnakar Kumar, under his own production house "Worldwide Channel". It stars Dinesh Lal Yadav and Nepali actress Neeta Dhungana (Bhojpuri film debut) in lead roles. Aayush Rijal, Sunil Thapa, Gopal Rai, Santosh Pahalwan and Amrit Kumar play supporting roles.

Plot
It is the story of a commando officer who goes on a special mission to Nepal. The mission is that the Indian intelligence agency RAW has received input that there may be an attack during the visit of the Indian Foreign Minister in Nepal and the Foreign Minister's life is in danger. They find out that an attacker is ambushed in an area 3.5 km from the site of the tour. Dinesh Lal Yadav Nirhua's character kills the attacker. While returning the convoy, they are attacked by goons riding bikes and Nirhua protects the Indian foreign minister from those terrorists.

Cast
Dinesh Lal Yadav as Commando Arjun Pandey
Neeta Dhungana as Sweaty
Sunil Thapa as RDX
Gopal Rai as Dinanath Pandey (Arjun's father)
Santosh Pahalwan as Scientist
Aayush Rijal as Krishna (Sweaty's brother)

Music

The music of the film is composed by Madhukar Anand, lyrics are penned by Santosh Puri, Sandeep Saajan, Jhulan Jheel and Arvind Tiwari. It was produced under Worldwide Records Bhojpuri label, who owned by Ratnakar Kumar producer of this film.

Production
Principal photography for the film began in Nepal in July 2018 and was completed in Jharkhand in November 2018.

Marketing
First-look poster of "Sher-E-Hindustan" was released in August 2018. Teaser of this film was released on 25 January 2019 at official YouTube sub-handle of Worldwide Records Bhojpuri, who owned his satellite rights.

Trailer of this film was released on 1 March 2019 at same sub-handle of teaser released.

References

2010s Bhojpuri-language films
Films shot in Nepal